The 3rd NACAC Under-23 Championships in Athletics were held in
Sherbrooke, Quebec, Canada, on July 30-August 1, 2004.  For the
first time the event was
open for athletes younger than 23 years rather than 25 years.  A detailed
report on the results was given.

Medal summary

Medal winners are published.
Complete results can be found on the Athletics Canada, on the AtletismoCR, and the CACAC
website.

Men

Women

†: Julie Bourgon from  started as guest in the discus throw event and became 2nd with 49.92 m.

Medal table (unofficial)

Participation
The participation of 243 athletes from 26 countries was reported.

 (1)
 (1)
 (10)
 (14)
 (1)
 (1)
 (1)
 (48)
 (3)
 (4)
 (1)
 (8)
 (4)
 (3)
 (3)
 Haïti (1)
 (28)
 México (21)
 (1)
 (14)
 (4)
 (2)
 (2)
 (1)
 (64)
 (1)

References

NACAC Under-23 Championships in Athletics
2004 in Canadian sports
NACAC U23 Championships
Sport in Sherbrooke
International track and field competitions hosted by Canada
2004 in Quebec
2004 in youth sport